Handsome Devil is a 2016 Irish comedy-drama film written and directed by John Butler. It centres around Ned (Fionn O'Shea), an ostracised teenager at an elite, rugby-obsessed, all-boys boarding school in Ireland. Ned's unlikely friendship with his new roommate Conor (Nicholas Galitzine), the school's star rugby player, is tested by those around them. The film features themes of homosexuality, while examining hypocrisy and snobbery in the Irish private school system.

Handsome Devil premiered at the 2016 Toronto International Film Festival in the Contemporary World Cinema section and was released in theatres in Ireland in April 2017. The film received critical acclaim, winning the award for Best Irish Feature of 2017 from the Dublin Film Critics' Circle. It also earned four nominations at the 2018 Irish Film and Television Academy (IFTA) Awards, including Best Feature Film; and the Best Single Drama Award at the annual Celtic Media Festival in 2018.

Plot
The film is set at the fictional Wood Hill College, an elite, rugby-obsessed, all-boys boarding school in Ireland modelled on Castleknock College and Blackrock College, and is seen through the eyes of Ned, an ostracised student at the school. He seems to be the only student at the school who does not enjoy rugby. A new student arrives at the school, Conor, a star rugby player who is assigned to be Ned's roommate. Though the two are initially wary of each other, they soon form a close friendship, with a particular interest in music. A new English teacher, Mr Sherry, also arrives at the school, who, though stern, is encouraging towards Ned and Conor. It is revealed throughout the film that the school generally discourages homophobic behaviour, particularly by the students and the rugby coach, Pascal.

During a night out celebrating with the rugby team, Conor sees Mr Sherry with his male partner at a gay bar. At the same time, Ned realises that Conor is gay after seeing him enter the bar. Later that night back at school, Pascal sees Mr Sherry and Conor talking and worries that Mr Sherry will have a negative effect on Conor. Pascal reports Mr Sherry to the headmaster.

At Mr Sherry's encouragement, Ned and Conor decide to perform a musical piece at the local elementary school's talent show. Pascal encourages another student, Weasel, to ask his cousin (who attends the same school that Conor did prior to his starting at Wood Hill) why Conor got into fights at his previous school. Weasel reports that Conor fought with students who discovered he was gay. Pascal uses this knowledge as blackmail, insinuating that if Conor does not pick different friends, his secret will be revealed. As a result, Conor does not go to the scheduled performance with Ned. Ned turns up at an event with the rugby team to find out why, and Conor shoves him away in front of the entire team.

Angry and frustrated, Ned outs Conor during a rugby rally. A remorseful Ned is suspended and Conor runs away.

As the final match approaches, Conor is still missing. Ned knows where to find him and brings him back to the stadium, where they argue to Pascal and the team that he can still be gay and a good rugby player. The team stands by Conor, ultimately forcing Pascal to concede. The team eventually wins the final while Mr Sherry comes out to the headmaster at the game. Ned returns to the school and wins the English writing competition using the story of his friendship with Conor in an essay titled "Handsome Devil".

Cast
 Fionn O'Shea as Ned Roche
 Nicholas Galitzine as Conor Masters
 Andrew Scott as Dan Sherry
 Moe Dunford as Pascal O'Keeffe
 Michael McElhatton as Walter Curly
 Ruairi O'Connor as Weasel
 Ardal O'Hanlon as Donal Roche
 Amy Huberman as Natalie Roche

Reception
On review aggregator Rotten Tomatoes, the film holds an approval rating of 83% based on 46 reviews, with an average rating of 6.59/10. The website's critical consensus reads, "Handsome Devil offers a charming, well-acted variation on the coming-of-age story with a few fresh topical twists." Metacritic gives the film a weighted average rating of 60 out of 100, based on 6 critics, indicating "mixed or average reviews".

Awards and nominations

References

External links
 
 

2016 films
2016 comedy-drama films
2016 LGBT-related films
2010s buddy comedy-drama films
2010s coming-of-age comedy-drama films
2010s English-language films
2010s sports comedy-drama films
2010s teen comedy-drama films
Films set in boarding schools
English-language Irish films
Films about school bullying
Films set in Ireland
Films shot in Fingal
Gay-related films
Icon Productions films
Irish coming-of-age comedy-drama films
Irish LGBT-related films
Irish teen comedy-drama films
LGBT-related buddy comedy-drama films
LGBT-related coming-of-age films
LGBT-related sports comedy-drama films
Rugby union films
Teen LGBT-related films
Teen sports films